The  Military Ordinariate of New Zealand  is a Latin Church military ordinariate of the Catholic Church. It is headquartered in Wellington. Immediately exempt to the Holy See, it provides pastoral care to Catholics serving in the New Zealand Defence Force and their families.

History
It was created as a military dictate on 28 October 1976, and elevated to a military ordinariate on 21 July 1986. The first military vicar, Owen Noel Snedden, was also an Auxiliary Bishop of Wellington. His successor, Edward Gaines, was also the Bishop of Hamilton. Since 1995, the post of Military Ordinary has been held by the Archbishops of Wellington.

Office holders

Military vicars
 Owen Noel Snedden (appointed 28 October 1976 – died 17 April 1981)
 Edward Gaines (appointed 19 June 1981 – became Military Ordinary 21 July 1986)

Military ordinaries
 Edward Gaines (appointed 21 July 1986 – died 6 September 1994)
 Cardinal Thomas Williams (appointed 1 June 1995 – retired 1 April 2005)
 John Dew (current incumbent, appointed 1 April 2005)

References

New Zealand
New Zealand
1976 establishments in New Zealand
Organisations based in Wellington
New Zealand